Collegians Football Club (nicknamed the Lions) is an Australian rules football club based in the Melbourne suburb of Albert Park. Formed in 1891, it is the second-oldest club in the VAFA, after Melbourne University Football Club. The Lions have the longest continuous membership of the VAFA and its antecedents. Their home ground is the Harry Trott Oval.

History
In 1891, L.A.Adamson established a Wesley College Old Boys’ XVIII, which formally became Collegians Football Club in 1892. Adamson, who was for thirty years the Headmaster of Wesley College, was the President of the club for its first forty years. In 1892, Adamson established the Metropolitan Junior Football Association (of which he was president for 37 years), which in 1932 became the Victorian Amateur Football Association. Their 17 "A" grade premierships is more than any other club. Collegian's introduced the clubs first Women's football team in 2017, and added a second women's team in 2018. The club fields three senior men's teams, two senior women's teams and an Under 19's team.

Premierships

A Section
 1892, 1896, 1898, 1899, 1902, 1904, 1936, 1937, 1957, 1958, 1959, 1961, 1986, 1992, 1993, 2011, 2012.

B Section
 1926, 1956, 2006

Club song
The club's theme song is based on the first verse and chorus of "The Old Collegians Song", which appears in the Wesley College Songbook in all editions from 1893.  The lyrics were written by Lawrence Arthur Adamson set to the tune of a traditional Irish Folk Tune, "Irish Jaunting Car", and the later tune "The Bonnie Blue Flag", a song from the US War of Independence.  The original lyrics refer to the interim school colours "Blue and White", which returned to "Gold and Purple" at the end of 1902.

References

External links

 Official Site
 The history of a great football club : Collegians centenary 1892-1992 / Laurie T. Humphries

Victorian Amateur Football Association clubs
1891 establishments in Australia
Australian rules football clubs established in 1891
Australian rules football clubs in Melbourne
Sport in the City of Port Phillip
Wesley College (Victoria)